is a Japanese singer and actress. She is notable for singing most of the various theme songs for the anime television series Touch along with Yumekojo.

In 2008, she joined the fantasy band Sound Horizon for the release of their 6th story CD Moira. However, she left the band for undisclosed reasons prior to the 6th Story Concert and was subsequently replaced by Azumi Inoue. She appeared in the No Laughing Hotel Man special of the popular variety show Gaki no Tsukai which took place in 2009, performing a new version of the song Touch with slightly altered lyrics.

Personal life
Her older sister Hiromi Iwasaki is also a singer.

Discography

Albums

Singles

Filmography
Belle (2021), Dr. Nakai (voice)

References

External links 
 
 JMDb profile 
 Homepage 

1961 births
Living people
Japanese actresses
Japanese women singers
Singers from Tokyo